Sikma, Sikkema or Siccama  is a West Frisian surname.   It originated as a patronymic surname, "son of Sikke".  Notable people with the surname include:

Jack Sikma (born 1955), American basketball player, father of Luke Sikma
Luke Sikma (born 1989), American basketball player, son of Jack Sikma
Sikkema
Ken Sikkema, Michigan politician

References

Surnames of Frisian origin
Patronymic surnames